Kim Yong-hwan is a politician of the Democratic People's Republic of Korea (North Korea). He is a member of the Party Censorship Committee and Chairman of the Pyongyang Party Committee of the Workers' Party of Korea.

Biography
In February 1997, he was appointed first vice-chairman of the Central Court of the Democratic People's Republic of Korea. In May 2016, at the 7th Congress of the Workers' Party of Korea he was elected as a member of the WPK Inspection Commission. After being appointed chairman of the Ryanggang Province Party Committee in December 2019, he was elected chairman of the Pyongyang Party Party Committee of the Workers' Party of Korea at the Political Bureau expanded meeting on February 29, 2020.

References

Year of birth missing (living people)
Living people
Alternate members of the 8th Politburo of the Workers' Party of Korea
Members of the 8th Central Committee of the Workers' Party of Korea